Arçay may refer to the following places in France:

Arçay, Cher, a commune in the department of Cher
Arçay, Vienne, a commune in the department of Vienne